is a 2014 Japanese romantic comedy film directed by Koji Maeda and starring Nana Eikura, Rin Takanashi, Koji Seto, and Ryo Kase. It was released on 14 June 2014.

Cast
Nana Eikura
Rin Takanashi
Koji Seto
Ryo Kase
Sosuke Ikematsu
Shingo Tsurumi
Jun Yoshinaga

Reception
The film has grossed ¥19.9 million in Japan.

On Film Business Asia, Derek Elley gave the film a rating of 6 out of 10, calling it a "rambling but likeable rom-com".

References

External links
 

2014 romantic comedy films
Japanese romantic comedy films
2010s Japanese films